The Sill is a  river in Tyrol, Austria. It is one of the larger tributaries of the Inn in Tyrol. It flows north through the Wipptal to Innsbruck. Its source lies east of the Brenner Pass. At the  - the name of the point where it meets the Inn at Innsbruck - there is a recreation area with cycling trails.

The Viggarbach merges with it in Schönberg im Stubaital.

The water power generated by the river flow is used for three power plants.

In the fall basin, fishes such as trouts can be found.

References

Rivers of Tyrol (state)
 
Rivers of Austria